The following is a list of people executed by the U.S. state of Texas between 1890 and 1899. During this period 101 people were executed by hanging.

Executions 1890–1899

See also
Capital punishment in Texas

References

1890
19th-century executions by Texas
1890s-related lists
1890s in Texas